The first USS Ossipee was a wooden, screw sloop-of-war in commission in the United States Navy at various times between 1861 and 1889. She served in the Union Navy during the American Civil War. She was named for the Ossipee River of New Hampshire and Maine. The USS Ossipee was present during the Alaska Purchase.

Construction
Ossipees keel was laid down in June 1861 by the Portsmouth Navy Yard, Kittery, Maine; launched 16 November 1861; sponsored by Mrs. McFarland, wife of the editor of the Concord Statesman; and commissioned 6 November 1862 Lieutenant Commander Robert Boyd in command.

Service history

Civil War, 1862–1865
Ten days later Captain John P. Gillis took command of the ship and she got underway for Hampton Roads to join the North Atlantic Blockading Squadron in which she served until departing Newport News, Virginia, 18 May 1863 to join the West Gulf Blockading Squadron off Mobile, Alabama. She captured schooner Helena there 30 June and with  seized steamers James Battle and William Bagley in the Gulf of Mexico on 18 July. The former, "the finest packet on the Alabama River...altered to suit her for a blockade runner," was laden with cotton and rosin while the latter carried cotton which they hoped to sell abroad.

In September Ossipee steamed to the coast of Texas for blockade duty until returning to station off Mobile in mid-March 1864 as Admiral David Farragut built up his forces for the invasion of Mobile Bay.

In September Ossipee returned to blockade duty off the Texas coast and, but for repairs at Pensacola, Florida late in 1864, served there until moving to New Orleans, Louisiana in April 1865. She was one of the Federal ships to pursue  during the Confederate steamer’s daring attempt to race down the Mississippi River and escape to sea.

Following duty off Mobile, Ossipee sailed North late in June and decommissioned at Philadelphia, Pennsylvania on 3 July.

Pacific, 1866–1872
Recommissioned 27 October 1866, Captain George F. Emmons in command, Ossipee served in the north Pacific protecting American interests along the coasts of Mexico and Central America. She departed San Francisco 27 September 1867 for Sitka, Alaska, carrying Russian Commissioners for the ceremony transferring Alaska to the United States on 18 October.

After serving in the Pacific into the spring of 1872, Ossipee headed home on 6 June. On 20 June, Seaman James Benson jumped overboard to rescue a shipmate, for which he was later awarded the Medal of Honor. Ossipee arrived in New York on 18 November, and was decommissioned there on the 30th.

North Atlantic, 1873–1878
Recommissioned 10 October 1873, the veteran sloop of war served in the North Atlantic. She departed Key West 15 December for Dry Tortugas to await filibustering steamer Virginius which had been seized on the high seas by the  under fraudulent American registry. Despatch took Virginius to Tortugas. Ossipee departed Tortugas 19 December towing Virginius north, but the notorious prize foundered off Cape Hatteras a week later. Ossipee continued operations in the North Atlantic until decommissioning at Boston 25 May 1878.

Asiatic Squadron, Atlantic, 1884–1891
Recommissioned 28 January 1884, Ossipee departed Hampton Roads 30 April for the Far East via Gibraltar and the Suez Canal and served on the Asiatic station until returning to New York 15 February 1887. She then served along the Atlantic coast and in the West Indies until decommissioning at Norfolk, Virginia 12 November 1889. She was sold there 25 March 1891 to Herbert H. Ives.

References

External links

 The Journal of the U.S.S. Ossipee, 27 October 1866 to 31 December 1867 Alaska's Digital Archives. Includes transfer ceremony of Alaska from Russia to the United States on 18 October 1867.

Ships of the Union Navy
Ships built in Kittery, Maine
Sloops of the United States Navy
Gunboats of the United States Navy
American Civil War patrol vessels of the United States
1861 ships